The Hairy Bikers' Food Tour of Britain is a 2009 BBC television cookery programme which is presented by The Hairy Bikers: Dave Myers and Si King.

The 30-part series, which aired weekdays at 17:15 on BBC Two in the United Kingdom began on 24 August 2009. In each show the Hairy Bikers visit a county of the United Kingdom, and learn about its food culture and heritage. One episode was postponed during its original run, due to the FIFA Women's World Cup Football Final.

Each episode features a "taste-off" competition, pitting the Bikers against a renowned chef currently based in the county.  Whilst showcasing the chef, the riff from Elbow song "Grounds for Divorce" is occasionally featured.

Episodes 

 "Suffolk"
 "Anglesey"
 "Fermanagh"	
 "Cheshire"	
 "Shropshire"
 "Lincolnshire"
 "Kent"
 "Dumfries and Galloway"
 "Antrim"
 "Oxfordshire"
 "East Sussex"
 "Gwynedd"
 "Somerset"
 "Cornwall" (broadcast at a later date, after the rest of the series)
 "North Yorkshire"
 "Herefordshire"
 "Leicestershire"
 "Gloucestershire"
 "Lancashire"
 "Carmarthenshire"
 "Worcestershire"
 "Derbyshire"
 "Monmouthshire"
 "Essex"
 "Argyll & Bute"
 "Norfolk"	
 "Aberdeenshire"
 "Staffordshire"
 "Hampshire"
 "Moray"

External links

The Hairy Bikers' official website

BBC Television shows
2000s British cooking television series
2009 British television series debuts
2009 British television series endings
British cooking television shows
English-language television shows
Motorcycle television series